The distinction between non-narrative film and "narrative films" can be rather vague and is open for interpretation. Few filmmakers would define their works as non-narrative. The following list contains films which have been described as "non-narrative" by independent sources.

See also
 :Category:Films without speech
 Nonlinear narrative
 List of nonlinear narrative films
 Slow cinema
 Structural film
 Surrealist cinema

References

Lists of films by genre
Narratology
!
Films by type
Experimental film
Lists of films